2014 in television may refer to
 2014 in American television for television related events in the United States.
 2014 in Australian television for television related events in Australia.
 2014 in Belgian television for television related events in Belgium.
 2014 in Brazilian television for television related events in Brazil.
 2014 in British television for television related events in Great Britain.
 2014 in Scottish television for television related events in Scotland.
 2014 in Canadian television for television related events in Canada.
 2014 in Danish television for television related events in Denmark.
 2014 in Dutch television for television related events in the Netherlands.
 2014 in Estonian television for television related events in Estonia.
 2014 in French television for television related events in France.
 2014 in German television for television related events in Germany.
 2014 in Irish television for television related events in Ireland.
 2014 in Italian television for television related events in Italy.
 2014 in Japanese television for television related events in Japan.
 2014 in Mexican television for television related events in Mexico.
 2014 in New Zealand television for television related events in New Zealand.
 2014 in Norwegian television for television related events in Norway.
 2014 in Pakistani television for television related events in Pakistan.
 2014 in Philippine television for television related events in the Philippines.
 2014 in Polish television for television related events in Poland.
 2014 in Portuguese television for television related events in Portugal.
 2014 in South African television for television related events in South Africa.
 2014 in Spanish television for television related events in Spain.
 2014 in Swedish television for television related events in Sweden.
 2014 in Turkish television for television related events in Turkey.

 
Mass media timelines by year